The 2000–01 First League of the Republika Srpska was the 6th football season since establishment in the Republika Srpska. Since Football Association of Republika Srpska is not a member of UEFA nor FIFA, league champion did not qualify for European tournament.

League table

See also
2000–01 Premier League of Bosnia and Herzegovina

External links
 FSRS Official website

Srpska
2000–01 in Bosnia and Herzegovina football
First League of the Republika Srpska seasons